İskenderun Harbor is a Mediterranean harbor of Turkey.

History
The harbor project goes back to 1911 when the construction was planned by the port administration of Haydarpaşa during the Ottoman Empire. But because of the First World War difficulties, the project could not be realized. The inner harbor was constructed by the French government between 1918-1937 when the city of İskenderun was under French rule. After the proclamation of the Hatay Republic and the merging to Turkey in 1939, the harbor was incorporated into the Turkish State Port Authorities. The harbor was rebuilt and enlarged in 1953, 1956, 1964 and 1972. On 20 December 2004 the infrastructure was handed over to Limak Company as part of the privatization program.

A large fire broke out at the port after the 2023 Turkey–Syria earthquake.

Technical details
Number of berths is 8.

See also
İskenderun railway station
Mersin Harbor

References

Buildings and structures in Hatay Province
Ports and harbours of Turkey
Ports and harbours of the Mediterranean
Buildings damaged by the 2023 Turkey–Syria earthquake